Saint-Léonard-de-Noblat is a commune in the Haute-Vienne department in the Nouvelle-Aquitaine region in west-central France, on a hill above the river Vienne. It is named after Saint Leonard of Noblac. The commune of Saint-Léonard-de-Noblat covers the town Saint-Léonard-de-Noblat and a number of small villages and hamlets, including Lajoumard.

Demographics
Inhabitants are known as Miaulétous.

Sights
Saint-Léonard-de-Noblat, Haute-Vienne, population 4766 in 1999, is one of the UNESCO World Heritage Sites connected with the routes to Santiago de Compostela. Dating partly from the 11th century, the church is a listed historic monument. Its old houses follow a medieval street pattern, with many streets converging in a public space by the former abbey church. In the 19th century, a papermill and a porcelain manufactory were added to its commerce. The place is also attracts visitors as an overnight stop on the Tour de France. The town is known for its native son, the scientist Joseph Louis Gay-Lussac (1778 – 1850); there is a small museum in his honor.

Notable people
Saint-Léonard-de-Noblat is the hometown of the chemist and physicist, Joseph Louis Gay-Lussac.

Adrien Pressemane, a porcelain painter, lived in the town and represented the district in parliament.

Raymond Poulidor, considered by some as the most popular racing cyclist in France, lived in the town. He was known as "the eternal second" of the Tour de France after repeatedly losing, often against Jacques Anquetil, who won five times. Poulidor later competed against Eddy Merckx, who also won five times. Poulidor's best victory was in Milan-Sanremo.

Serge Gainsbourg, (Lucien Ginzburg) (1928-1991), took refuge a few months during the year 1944 to the local high school, thereby escaping the persecution of Jews (his parents had immigrated from Crimea) . A comprehensive article on this stay appears in the journal "Memory of Here" (No. 3). His presence in Saint Léonard - it lasted about 6 months - has long been ignored, to the point of creating a controversy about a street name (2001). Only the Press House now named after the singer. The debate is closed, since the arrival of Serge in Saint-Léonard has been proven by several witnesses.

Gilles Deleuze, French philosopher, lived and is buried there.

Mario David, of his real name Jacques Paul Jules Marie David, French actor, (1927-1996) was at school here.

Georges-Emmanuel Clancier, (1914-2018), French writer and poet. In Saint-Léonard-de-Noblat, he met Raymond Queneau and Michel Leiris.

Daniel-Henri Kahnweiler (1884-1979), German writer and collector, who promoted the Cubist movement and discovered, among others, Picasso and Braque, took refuge in Saint-Léonard during the war.

Philippe de Vomécourt (1902-1964), French Resistance and Special Operations Executive (SOE) agent in World War II. His home was near Noblat.

Clémentine Jouassain (1829-1902), actress of the Comédie-Française, was born in Saint-Léonard-de-Noblat.

See also
Communes of the Haute-Vienne department

References

External links

Official website

Communes of Haute-Vienne
World Heritage Sites in France
County of La Marche